Marquette National Forest was established by the U.S. Forest Service in Chippewa County, Michigan on February 10, 1909, with . On July 1, 1915, the entire forest was transferred to Michigan National Forest and the name was discontinued. On February 9, 1962, the entire forest was transferred to Hiawatha National Forest and the name was re-discontinued. What was Marquette National Forest currently comprises the East Unit of Hiawatha National Forest.

References

External links
Forest History Society
Listing of the National Forests of the United States and Their Dates (from the Forest History Society website) Text from Davis, Richard C., ed. Encyclopedia of American Forest and Conservation History. New York: Macmillan Publishing Company for the Forest History Society, 1983. Vol. II, pp. 743-788.

Former National Forests of the United States
Protected areas established in 1909
Protected areas established in 1931
1909 establishments in Michigan